Lithocarpus kalkmanii is a tree in the beech family Fagaceae. This species is named for the Dutch botanist Cornelis Kalkman.

Description
The brownish or greyish bark is cracked or lenticellate. This species produces fruits with an 'enclosed receptacle' morphology, where the seed becomes embedded in the basal tissue of the fruit as it develops. This basal material becomes woody, granular and hard and replaces the outer wall of the ovary as the mechanically protective tissue for the seed.

Classification
This species probably belongs to the subgenus Eulithocarpus, based on Camus' infrageneric classification system, because of its 'ER' fruit morphology and the few widely spaced concentric lamellae on the cupule.

Distribution and habitat
Lithocarpus kalkmanii is endemic to Borneo where it is known only from Sabah.

References

kalkmanii
Endemic flora of Borneo
Trees of Borneo
Flora of Sabah
Plants described in 1998
Flora of the Borneo lowland rain forests
Flora of the Borneo montane rain forests